David Daly (June 1874 – 18 May 1944) was a South African cricketer. He played in five first-class matches for Eastern Province from 1896/97 to 1902/03.

See also
 List of Eastern Province representative cricketers

References

External links
 

1874 births
1944 deaths
South African cricketers
Eastern Province cricketers
Cricketers from Port Elizabeth